The 2011 Chichester District Council election took place on 5 May 2011 to elect members of Chichester District Council in England. This was on the same day as other local elections.

References

2011 English local elections
May 2011 events in the United Kingdom
2011
2010s in West Sussex